

Hans Korte (16 December 1899 – 8 April 1990) was a German general during World War II. He was a recipient of the Knight's Cross of the Iron Cross of Nazi Germany. Korte surrendered to the British troops in May 1945 and was interned until October 1947.

Awards 

 Knight's Cross of the Iron Cross on 30 September 1944 as Generalmajor and commander of the 2.(Torpedo)/Flieger-Division

References

Citations

Bibliography

 

1899 births
1990 deaths
People from the Province of Hanover
People from Dannenberg (Elbe)
Luftwaffe World War II generals
German Army personnel of World War I
Recipients of the clasp to the Iron Cross, 1st class
Recipients of the Gold German Cross
Recipients of the Knight's Cross of the Iron Cross
German prisoners of war in World War II held by the United Kingdom
Prussian Army personnel
Reichswehr personnel
Major generals of the Luftwaffe
Military personnel from Lower Saxony